Smallhold is an American specialty mushroom company based in Brooklyn, New York. Founded in 2017 by Adam DeMartino and Andrew Carter, Smallhold currently operates indoor mushroom farms in New York City, Austin, and Los Angeles. Smallhold produces yellow oyster, blue oyster, lion's mane, maitake, shiitake, and trumpet mushrooms, along with selling kits for customers to cultivate mushrooms at home.

References 

Agriculture companies established in 2017
American companies established in 2017
Farms in New York City